PBC CSKA Moscow is a Russian professional basketball team based in Moscow, Russia. The club is a member of the VTB United League, and was a member of the EuroLeague. On February 28, 2022, EuroLeague Basketball suspended all Russian teams because of the Russian invasion of Ukraine.

CSKA won two titles between 2006 and 2008, as well as between 2016 and 2019, in Europe's principal club competition, the EuroLeague, making the final in all seasons these years, and in total has advanced to the EuroLeague Final Four 18 times in the 21st century.

CSKA is dominating in VTB United League, winning all but two title to date. With 8 EuroLeague championships, 1 NEBL championship, 51 home league championships, 7 home cups, 1 home Supercup and 10 VTB United League titles in total, CSKA is the most successful basketball team in Russia (former Soviet Union), and is also one of the most successful basketball teams in Europe.

In EuroLeague in 2006 CSKA won its first title in a long time, defeating Maccabi Tel Aviv 73–69 in the final in Prague. Next year the team lost in the 2007 final 93–91 to Panathinaikos on the Greens' home floor, the Nikos Galis Olympic Indoor Hall in Athens. In 2008, they won a rematch of the 2006 final against Maccabi 91–77 in Madrid. In 2009, they lost a rematch of the 2007 final against Panathinaikos 73–71 in Berlin. The club competed in 8 consecutive EuroLeague Final Fours from 2003 to 2010, which is an all-time record. Later the team beat its own record by making it to 9 consecutive Final Fours from 2012 to 2021 (with 2020 Final Four cancelled due to COVID-19 situation). CSKA then won its seventh title in 2016, after beating Fenerbahçe in the final, by a score of 101–96, in overtime. The last European title up-to-date was won in 2019, when CSKA defeated  Anadolu Efes in the final in Vitoria-Gasteiz.

Well-known players who have played for the club over the years include: Sergei Belov, Gennadi Volnov, Viktor Zubkov, Yuri Korneev, Vladimir Andreev, Anatoly Myshkin, Stanislav Yeryomin, Ivan Edeshko, Armenak Alachachian, Alzhan Zharmukhamedov, Heino Enden, Jaak Lipso, Sergei Tarakanov, Rimas Kurtinaitis, Vladimir Tkachenko, Sergei Bazarevich, Sasha Volkov, Andrei Kirilenko, Trajan Langdon, Darius Songaila, Gordan Giriček, Dragan Tarlać, Marcus Brown, Matjaž Smodiš, Sergei Panov, Aleksey Savrasenko, Ramūnas Šiškauskas, Theo Papaloukas, Nenad Krstić, J. R. Holden, Sasha Kaun, Miloš Teodosić, Victor Khryapa, Nando de Colo, Kyle Hines, Cory Higgins, Sergio Rodriguez and Will Clyburn. Also, Alexander Gomelsky, the Naismith Memorial Basketball Hall of Fame basketball coach, worked in CSKA for more than 20 years. Nowadays, CSKA has the reputation for being one of the richest sports clubs in Europe, having been previously owned by Russian billionaire Mikhail Prokhorov, and being currently owned by Norilsk Nickel.

History

1923–1991
CSKA was founded on 29 April 1923, then known as OPPV, when on that day soldiers and sportsmen fought in football against each other for the first place of Moscow. "OPPV", which means Опытно-показательная военно-спортивная площадка всевобуча, a department in the General military education service, was the first central sports department of the Red Army. It was based on the pre-revolutionary "Community of Amateur Skiers".

The first success of the basketball department came at the 1924 Soviet League championship, which was played between cities, not clubs. Two more titles followed in 1928 and 1935. In 1938, the Soviet League championship was played between clubs, and CSKA under the name CDKA (Центральный дом Красной Армии, Central House of the Red Army) debuted there. Stalin's son, Vasily, then founded the club VVS MVO (Военно-Воздушные Силы Московского Военного Округа), with CDKA merging with it. By the end of the Great Patriotic War, CSKA established itself as one of the most respected Soviet basketball teams.

In 1953 and 1954, the club was renamed CDSA (Центральный дом Советской Армии, Central House of the Soviet Army), between 1955 and 1960, it was known as CSK MO, and finally in 1960, it received its current name CSKA (Центральный спортивный клуб Армии, Central Sports Club of the Army).

CSKA won the FIBA European Champions Cup (now called EuroLeague) title, in 1961, 1963, 1969, and 1971. They also won the Soviet League championship 24 times (1945, 1960–1962, 1964–1966, 1969–1974, 1976–1984, 1988, and 1990).

1992–2008
CSKA won the Russian League title every year from 1992 through 2000, and every year from 2003 to 2008. CSKA also made the 1996 EuroLeague Final Four. They also made the 2001 SuproLeague Final Four, the 2003 EuroLeague Final Four, the 2004 EuroLeague Final Four and the 2005 EuroLeague Final Four, before finally winning the EuroLeague championship at the 2006 EuroLeague Final Four.

In the 2004–05 season, CSKA eventually lost in the semifinals on their home court to Spanish League club TAU Cerámica, and to Panathinaikos, of the Greek League, in the third-place game. That sent them to the 2nd grade teams in the EuroLeague draw. That same year they also lost a game in the finals series of the Russian League, but they eventually got the Russian League crown.

In 2006, CSKA qualified for the 2004–05 EuroLeague Top 16, by finishing third in their group. They finished at the top of their Top 16 group, being denied a perfect record at Tau, in their final game. CSKA entered the 2006 EuroLeague Final Four on a roll, as the only club to sweep their best-of-three quarterfinal series, by defeating Turkish Super League power Efes Pilsen. They defeated Barça in the EuroLeague semis, before defeating the high-powered offense of Maccabi Tel Aviv, of the Israeli Basketball Super League, in the final, on April 30, even though the overall record of Maccabi's games with CSKA Moscow favored the Israeli club.

The following year, they faced Panathinaikos in the final, on the Greek team's home floor, OAKA Indoor Hall, which had been designated more than a year earlier as the site for that year's Final Four. Panathinaikos won. In 2008, their EuroLeague championship win at the 2008 EuroLeague Final Four, put them in sole possession of second place for overall top-tier level European-wide titles. On October 14, 2008, the team played an NBA preseason game against the Toronto Raptors, at Air Canada Centre, in Toronto.

2009–2021

CSKA won the Russian League title every year from 2009 through 2018, continuing to add to their streak of consecutive Russian League titles won every year since 2003 overall. Since the foundation of the VTB United League in 2008, CSKA has dominated the league, winning the title in 10 of its first 11 seasons (2010, 2012–2019, 2021), excluding the league's Promotional Cup in 2008.

EuroLeague success, however, continued to elude the team. From 2009, CSKA had played in the Final Four every single year except 2011. However, CSKA suffered multiple heartbreaks. CSKA struggled, in particular playing Olympiacos, who beat CSKA in the EuroLeague finals in 2012, and eliminated CSKA in 2013 and 2015. In 2014, CSKA lost a shocker to Maccabi Tel Aviv. CSKA won 3rd place in 2010, 2013 and 2015. 

In the 2015–16 season, CSKA won its 7th EuroLeague championship. At the Berlin Final Four, CSKA Moscow defeated Fenerbahçe, by a score of 101–96, after overtime. The star player of CSKA was Nando de Colo, who was named both the season EuroLeague MVP, and the EuroLeague Final Four MVP. In 2016–2017, CSKA reached the Final Four again, but once again lost to Olympiacos in the semifinals. CSKA beat Real Madrid to win 3rd place. 

In 2017-18 season CSKA guaranteed its first place of the regular season, beating Olympiacos at home on March 22 with a score of 89:81, and finished with a 24–6 record. Qualifying to the Final Four once again, however, CSKA suffered a complete fiasco - losing to Real Madrid in the semifinals, and to BC Žalgiris in the 3rd place game. In the VTB United League, CSKA secured their 9th title after defeating Khimki 95:84 in the 2018 Final Four.

In the next season CSKA finished at the 2nd place of the regular season, securing its 17th Final Four appearance in the 21 century. In Vitoria-Gasteiz the club made a comeback during the semifinals against Real Madrid and beat Anadolu Efes in the final, achieving 8th title in club's history. CSKA also won the VTB United League, sweeping Khimki 3:0 in the finals.

There were changes in the 2019–20 season.  Defending champion CSKA Moscow played steady until November, when they suffered four losses in a row, stepping down to the 6th position at worst. Due to the COVID-19 pandemic, CSKA and all other teams quit playing after the 28th round; there was no winner declared. At the time of the season's stopping, CSKA was behind Khimki in the VTB standings. The tournament was also stopped with no winner being announced.

In the 2020-2021 season, CSKA again lead in the EuroLeague standings for much of the season, before repeated conflicts by Itoudis, CSKA management, and Mike James resulted in James, team leader, leaving the team in March. While losing the first place in the standings to FC Barcelona, CSKA went all the way to the EuroLeague Final Four. CSKA, however, lost to Efes in the semifinals, and were beaten by EA7 Emporio Armani Milan in the third place game, thus finishing the season in disappointing 4th place. In the VTB United League, despite finishing the regular season in just 4th place, CSKA beat Nizhny Novgorod 2-1 in the quarterfinals, regular season winners Zenit Saint Petersburg 3-1 in the semifinals, and UNICS Kazan 3-0 in the finals to win the VTB United League once again.

2022–present
CSKA changed much of their roster during the summer. For much of the 2021-2022 season, CSKA fought for a spot in the EuroLeague playoffs. 

In early 2022, upon the outbreak of the 2022 Russian invasion of Ukraine, Tornike Shengelia from Georgia (saying: "Everyone says it was a difficult or big decision, but it was not. First of all, I felt that my family was threatened, even though the war was not in Moscow. With war you never know what will occur, one second is enough for something to happen. The first thing I wanted to do was to send my family away and then I made the decision to depart too."),  Johannes Voigtmann from Germany ("I can't reconcile myself playing for a Russian team....  The Russian president is responsible for a brutal war, because of which innocent people are dying in Ukraine. Millions of people have to flee their homes, and children, in particular, are losing their homes or even their lives. I just couldn't stay in Russia and carry on as if nothing had happened...."), Gabriel Lundberg from Denmark, Marius Grigonis from Lithuania, Italian-American Daniel Hackett, and Russian-American Joel Bolomboy all left the team. Canadian-Slovenian Kevin Pangos who signed with CSKA one day before the war started never joined the team. The team informed them all that the departure means violating of their contracts and reached the agreements on terminating the contracts with all but one player, Joel Bolomboy, who was given a letter of clearance by FIBA to sign for Olympiacos Piraeus when his CSKA contract expired in summer of 2022. CSKA informed about the intention to sue Bolomboy for breaching his CSKA agreement earlier. 

On February 28, 2022, EuroLeague Basketball suspended the team because of Russia's invasion of Ukraine. On March 22, 2022, CSKA, UNICS Kazan, and Zenit St. Petersburg were disqualified from the EuroLeague. In October 2022, CSKA Moscow president Andrey Vatutin said: "Owners and sponsors are in crisis and are not interested in spending big money just to participate in the VTB league – therefore the budget is reduced. We have left the international scene, so CSKA’s role in world basketball is declining."

In the VTB United League, CSKA made the finals once again. Despite leading 3-1 in the finals, CSKA lost the last three games to Zenit St. Petersburg, who won the VTB title with a 4-3 series win - for the first time since 2010-2011, CSKA did not win the competition. Greek head coach Dimitrios Itoudis left the team in June 2022, immediately after losing the final game to Zenit, with one year remaining on his contract.

Home arenas

CSKA played all of its home games, both national domestic league games, and European league games, at the 5,500 seat Universal Sports Hall CSKA, from 1979 to 2015. They also played a home EuroLeague game at the 13,344 seat Megasport Arena, on January 23, 2008. Starting with the 2015–16 season, CSKA began regularly playing its home EuroLeague games at Megasport Arena, while still playing at CSKA Universal Sports Hall for VTB United League games. Kaliningrad's Yantarny Sports Palace was used as a substitute for their round of 16 and 17 home games during the 2019-20  EuroLeague season.

Since 2021, due to the demolition of USH CSKA, the club decided to use Megasport as its main arena, and Moscow Basket Hall as its reserve.

Players

Current roster

Depth chart

Honours

Domestic competitions
 USSR Premier League (defunct)
 Winners (24): 1944–45, 1959–60, 1960–61, 1961–62, 1963–64, 1964–65, 1965–66, 1968–69, 1969–70, 1970–71, 1971–72, 1972–73, 1973–74, 1975–76, 1976–77, 1977–78, 1978–79, 1979–80, 1980–81, 1981–82, 1982–83, 1983–84, 1987–88, 1989–90
 Runners-up (11): 1945–46, 1950–51, 1952–53, 1953–54, 1954–55, 1956–57, 1957–58, 1974–75, 1984–85, 1985–86, 1986–87
 Russian League
 Winners (27): 1992, 1992–93, 1993–94, 1994–95, 1995–96, 1996–97, 1997–98, 1998–99, 1999–00, 2002–03, 2003–04, 2004–05, 2005–06, 2006–07, 2007–08, 2008–09, 2009–10, 2010–11, 2011–12, 2012–13, 2013–14, 2014–15, 2015–16, 2016–17, 2017–18, 2018–19, 2020–21
 Runners-up (1): 2021–22
 VTB United League
 Winners (10):  2009–10, 2011–12, 2012–13, 2013–14, 2014–15, 2015–16, 2016–17, 2017–18, 2018–19, 2020–21
 Runners-up (2): 2010–11, 2021–22
 USSR Cup (defunct)
 Winners (3): 1971–72, 1972–73, 1981–82
 Russian Cup
 Winners (4): 2004–05, 2005–06, 2006–07, 2009–10
 Runners-up (3): 2002–03, 2003–04, 2007–08
 VTB United League Supercup
 Winners (1): 2021
 Runners-up (1): 2022

European competitions
 EuroLeague
 Winners (8): 1960–61, 1962–63, 1968–69, 1970–71, 2005–06, 2007–08, 2015–16, 2018–19
 Runners-up (6): 1964–65, 1969–70, 1972–73, 2006–07, 2008–09, 2011–12
 Semifinalists (1): 1961–62
 3rd place (8): 1965–66, 1976–77, 1995–96, 2003–04, 2009–10, 2012–13, 2014–15, 2016–17
 4th place (8): 1982–83, 1984–85, 2000–01, 2002–03, 2004–05, 2013–14, 2017–18, 2020–21
 Final Four (20): 1966, 1996, 2001, 2003, 2004, 2005, 2006, 2007, 2008, 2009, 2010, 2012, 2013, 2014, 2015, 2016, 2017, 2018, 2019, 2021
 FIBA Saporta Cup (defunct)
 Semifinalists (2): 1985–86, 1986–87
 FIBA Korać Cup (defunct)
 Semifinalists (1): 1989–90
 European Super Cup (semi-official, defunct)
 3rd place (1): 1988

Other competitions
 FIBA International Christmas Tournament (friendly, defunct)
 Winners (1): 1998

   VTB United League Promo-Cup 
 Winners (1): 2008

 Gomelsky Cup
 Winners (10): 2010, 2011, 2012, 2013, 2014, 2015, 2016, 2018, 2019, 2020
 Runners-up (2): 2009, 2017

Moscow tournament 
 Winners (1): 2006

Cologne tournament 
 Runners-up (1): 2006

 Gloria Cup
 Winners (2): 2014, 2019
 Runners-up (1): 2018

 Zadar Basketball Tournament
 Runners-up (2): 2017, 2018

 Vladimir Kondrashin and Alexander Belov Tournament 
 Winners (6): 2003, 2004, 2005, 2006, 2008, 2010
 Runners-up (2): 2021, 2022

 Nikos Galis Cup
 Runners-up (1)'': 2014

Venice, Italy Invitational Game
 Winners (1): 2008

Verona, Italy Invitational Game
 Winners (1): 2008

 Rossiiskie Zheleznye Dorogi Cup
 Winners (1): 2011

 Trofeo Città di Caserta
 Winners (1): 2011

Moderna, Italy Invitational Game
 Winners (1): 2012

Siena, Italy Invitational Game
 Winners (1): 2013

Bologna, Italy Invitational Game
 Winners (1): 2013

Patras, Greece Invitational Game
 Winners (1): 2014

 Moscow, Russia Invitational Game
 Winners (5): 2015, 2017, 2018, 2019, 2020

 Çankaya, Turkey Invitational Game
 Winners (1): 2015

 Konya, Turkey Invitational Game
 Winners (1): 2015

 Thessaloniki, Greece Invitational Game
 Winners (1): 2016

 Shenzhen, China Invitational Game
 Winners (1): 2016

 Belek, Turkey Invitational Game
 Winners (1): 2019

 Neva Cup
 Winners (1): 2020

 Neofytos Chandriotis
 Winners (1): 2021

Regional competitions
 North European League (defunct)
 Winners (1): 1999–00

Individual club awards
 Double 
 Winners (7): 1971–72, 1972–73, 1981–82, 2004–05, 2005–06, 2006–07, 2009–10
 Triple Crown
 Winners (1): 2005–06

Season by season

Notable players

  Evgeny Alekseev
  Vladimir Andreev
  Sergei Bazarevich
  Sergei Belov
  Ivan Edeshko
  Yuri Korneev
  Valery Miloserdov
  Anatoly Myshkin
  Viktor Pankrashkin
  Sergei Tarakanov
  Valeri Tikhonenko
  Vladimir Tkachenko
  Gennadi Volnov
  Stanislav Yeryomin
  Viktor Zubkov
  Armenak Alachachian
  Heino Enden
  Jaak Lipso
  Tiit Sokk
  Gundars Vētra
  Rimas Kurtinaitis
  Alexander Belostenny
  Sergei Kovalenko
  Anatolij Kovtun
  Sasha Volkov
  Alzhan Zharmukhamedov
  Ruslan Avleev
  Aleksandr Bashminov
  Dmitri Domani
  Vitaly Fridzon
  Vasily Karasev
  Sasha Kaun
  Victor Khryapa
  Andrei Kirilenko
  Evgeni Kisurin
  Igor Kudelin
  Nikita Kurbanov
  Sergei Monia
  Nikita Morgunov
  Sergei Panov
  Zakhar Pashutin
  Alexey Savrasenko
  Alexey Shved
  Dmitri Sokolov
  J. R. Holden
  Vitaly Nosov
  Victor Keyru
  Andrey Vorontsevich
  Aleksei Zozulin
  Rubén Wolkowyski
  David Andersen
  Tomas Van Den Spiegel
  Vladan Alanović
  Gordan Giriček
  Zoran Planinić
  Mate Skelin
  Gabriel Lundberg
  Martin Müürsepp
  Nando de Colo
  Pops Mensah-Bonsu
  Joel Freeland
  Dimos Dikoudis
  Nikos Chatzivrettas
  Theo Papaloukas
  Nikos Zisis
  Gintaras Einikis
  Darjuš Lavrinovič
  Ramūnas Šiškauskas
  Darius Songaila
  Julius Nwosu
  Sergio Rodríguez
  Zoran Erceg
  Boban Marjanović
  Nenad Krstić
  Dragan Tarlać
  Miloš Teodosić
  Erazem Lorbek
  Matjaž Smodiš
  Mirsad Türkcan
  Viacheslav Kravtsov
  Victor Alexander
  Marcus Brown
  Will Clyburn
  Patrick Eddie
  Chuck Evans
  Kenneth Faried
  Jamont Gordon
  Marcus Goree
  Antonio Granger
  Cory Higgins
  Kyle Hines
  Othello Hunter
  Mike James
  Trajan Langdon
  Rusty LaRue
  Curtis McCants
   Sammy Mejia
  Terence Morris
  Marcus Webb
  Sonny Weems
  David Vanterpool
  Aaron Jackson
  Óscar Torres

Head coaches

Matches against NBA teams

See also
2007–08 PBC CSKA Moscow season

References

External links

  
 EuroLeague Profile

 
Cska Moscow
Cska Moscow
Cska Moscow
Cska Moscow
Cska Mocsow
CSKA Moscow